The Baltimore-based Research Institute for Advanced Studies (RIAS), not to be confused with the better-known Institute for Advanced Study in Princeton, New Jersey, was among the several centers for research in the mathematical and physical sciences established throughout the United States after World War II. In recognition of the critical role that fundamental scientific research played in the outcome of that war. Although not as well known as other similar institutes, such as the IAS mentioned above, or the RAND Corporation, it nevertheless made significant contributions to the sciences of systems and control theory, and various branches of mathematics, during its 18-year existence.

The Research Institute for Advanced Studies (sometimes referred to in the singular) was founded in 1955 by George Bunker of the Glenn L. Martin Company, the ancestor of the aerospace giant Lockheed Martin. Its founding was the idea of George Bunker, who took over from Glenn Martin as chairman of that company in 1952. Like the leaders of other aircraft companies in the United States, Bunker recognized that the future of aviation lay in applying new ideas of fundamental research in mathematics, electronics, and physics that had been developed during World War II. Bunker established the Institute in Baltimore, Maryland, specifically chartered to support fundamental research. The RIAS's first Director was Welcome W. Bender.

The Institute distinguished itself as one of the world's leading centers of mathematical research, especially in control and systems theory. Among the mathematicians on its staff were Solomon Lefschetz and Rudolf E. Kálmán (who while at the Institute in 1960 published a famous paper that was the basis for the Kalman Filter, a technique for extracting information from a noisy channel that finds applications in many facets of modern life), as well as Joseph P. LaSalle (who in 1960 published a paper describing LaSalle's invariance principle), Jack K. Hale, Harold J. Kushner, Walter Murray Wonham and others. While at RIAS in the early 1960s, Rodney Driver undertook research on delay differential equations and their applications.

The RIAS changed its name and turned its mission away from basic research in 1973, after the merger that produced the Martin Marietta Corporation.

References

External links 
 The Kalman Filter

Research institutes in Maryland
Mathematical institutes